The zygomaticus major muscle is a muscle of the human body. It extends from each zygomatic arch (cheekbone) to the corners of the mouth. It is a muscle of facial expression which draws the angle of the mouth superiorly and posteriorly to allow one to smile. Bifid zygomaticus major muscle is a notable variant, and may cause cheek dimples.

Structure 
The zygomaticus major muscle originates from the upper margin of the temporal process, part of the lateral surface of the zygomatic bone. It inserts into tissue at the corner of the mouth.

Nerve supply 
The zygomaticus major muscle is supplied by a buccal branch and a zygomatic branch of the facial nerve (VII).

Variation 
The zygomaticus major muscle may occur in a bifid form, with two fascicles that are partially or completely separate from each other but adjacent. Usually a single unit, dimples are caused by variations in form. It is thought that cheek dimples are caused by bifid zygomaticus major muscle.

Function 
The zygomaticus major muscle raises the corners of the mouth and draws them posteriorly when a person smiles. The average muscle can contract with a force of 200 g.

Clinical significance 
The zygomaticus major muscle may be used in reconstructive surgery to replace lost tissue, such as with injuries to the lips.

Image

See also 

 Zygomaticus minor muscle

References

External links 

 Zygomaticus Major
 Clips of muscle action

Muscles of the head and neck